SOTIO Biotech is a Czech biotechnology company focused on clinical-stage research and development of innovative medicines for cancer with operations in Europe, North America, and Asia. The company has clinical programs which include a superagonist of the immuno-oncology target IL-15, a new generation of potent and stable antibody-drug conjugates (ADCs), proprietary technology designed to improve on the efficacy of CAR T therapies and a platform to streamline and enhance personalized cell therapies.

Founding 
The company was founded in 2010 and in 2012 became part of PPF Group, owned by Petr Kellner. The CEO of the company is Radek Špíšek, who has been with the company since its beginning, initially functioning as Chief Scientific Officer.

Operations 
SOTIO conducts global operations in Europe, the USA, and China. In January 2020, the company announced the founding of its subsidiary SOTIO Biotech AG in Basel, Switzerland. SOTIO also operates laboratory complexes Prague, Czech Republic and Beijing, China where it produces treatments for people suffering from oncological diseases.

Pipeline 
SOTIO is currently testing multiple oncology products at different stages of clinical development.

IL-15 Superagonist 
Immune cytokine IL-15 is an immuno-oncology target that mobilizes cytotoxic T cells and natural killer (NK) cells. Stimulating IL-15 receptors on these cells represents a potent and complementary mechanism to existing cancer treatments.

SOTIO is developing an IL-15 superagonist, SO-C101, which is designed to have significant advantages over other IL-2 and IL-15 based therapies that are currently in development. SO-C101 is fused to the IL-15 alpha chain receptor, which confers specific binding to cytotoxic T cell and NK cells, which may provide superior efficacy and safety profile. Fusion to the IL-15 alpha chain receptor also optimizes half-life, which may improve efficacy by limiting T cell exhaustion.

SOTIO is currently conducting an ongoing Phase 1/1b dose finding study at leading clinical centers in the U.S. and EU to examine SO-C101 as monotherapy and in combination with pembrolizumab in patients with relapsed/refractory advanced/metastatic solid tumors. Interim data demonstrate that SO-C101 has been well tolerated to date, with no dose limiting toxicities observed.

BOXR 
SOTIO's BOXR cell therapy platform is designed to improve functionality of engineered T cells by discovering novel “bolt-on” transgenes that can be co-expressed with tumor-targeting receptors to overcome resistance and improve the function of T cells in the solid tumor microenvironment.

Lead candidate BOXR1030 uniquely combines the BOXR-discovered GOT2 transgene, a critical enzyme involved in cellular metabolism, with CAR T technology. BOXR1030 is designed to improve CAR T therapy function in the microenvironment by enhancing T cell fitness in the solid tumor microenvironment. Tumor infiltrating lymphocytes isolated from the tumors of treated animals revealed that BOXR1030 cells were more resistant to dysfunction and had fewer markers of exhaustion as compared to the control CAR T cells.

Antibody Drug Conjugates 
SOTIO, in collaboration with its partner NBE Therapeutics, is developing oncology candidates based on its platform of potent and highly stable ADCs with an unprecedented therapeutic window. Preclinical data show that these ADCs have a strong efficacy in direct tumor cell killing and a good tolerability profile, but in addition, also induce specific antitumor immunity, thereby providing a dual approach to cancer protection. SOTIO currently has two antibody drug conjugate candidates in preclinical trials, SOT102 and SOT107.

Partners 
SOTIO has its own scientific research and development and also collaborates with other partners. In recent years, SOTIO and PPF have focused on investing in a number of biotechnology companies developing innovative anticancer treatments in Europe and the US. Such as the Swiss NBE-Therapeutics on the development of novel antibody-drug conjugate products (ADC), with its affiliate Cytune Pharma on developing novel IL-15-based immunotherapies for the treatment of cancer.

In August 2018, SOTIO acquired Cytune Pharma and announced the continued development of the company's lead program SO-C101 (RLI-15) which is a human fusion protein of IL-15 and the high-affinity binding domain of IL-15Ra. It is a novel immunotherapeutic approach to cancer treatment with potential applications in a variety of oncology indications. The first clinical trial for the program was launched in summer 2019.

Investments 
At the end of 2020, PPF sold its stake in NBE-Therapeutics, a company developing innovative ADC products for the treatment of solid tumours, to the leading global pharmaceutical company Boehringer Ingelheim. This deal, the largest of its kind to be witnessed in Europe in ten years, showed the value of the ADCs that SOTIO maintains in its portfolio and that it continues to develop. These products could reach their first patients in 2022 in the first phase of clinical trials.

SOTIO is also managing PPF's investments in biotechnology companies Autolus Therapeutics and Cellestia Biotech.

References

Biotechnology
Life sciences industry
Biotechnology companies of the Czech Republic
PPF Group